Identity and Action (IDeA) is a conservative political party in Italy, whose membership stretches from Christian democracy to liberal conservatism.

The party's leader is Gaetano Quagliariello, a former minister for Institutional Reforms.

History
The party, whose complete name is Identity and Action – People and Freedom (Identità e Azione – Popolo e Libertà), was formed on 25 November 2015 by a group of splinters from the New Centre-Right (NCD), a centre-right party which was then part of government led by Matteo Renzi, leader of the centre-left Democratic Party (PD). Two deputies (Vincenzo Piso and Eugenia Roccella) and four senators (Andrea Augello, Luigi Compagna, Carlo Giovanardi and Gaetano Quagliariello) left the NCD because they no longer supported its alliance with the PD. They were joined by two deputies, Guglielmo Vaccaro (ex-PD, later Unique Italy–IU) and Renata Bueno (South American Union Italian Emigrants–USEI), and several regional politicians, including Davide Bellomo (independent, Apulia), Stefano Casali (Tosi List for Veneto, Veneto), Giovanni Chiodi (independent, former President of Abruzzo) and Vittoriano Solazzi (Marche 2020, Marche).

Since its foundation, IdeA aimed at being part of the larger centre-right coalition. The party established a particularly close relationship with Unique Italy (IU), of which Quagliariello became speaker in the Senate. In the meantime, the four deputies of IdeA, along with Aniello Formisano of Italy of Values (IdV, a party which had long been part of centre-left coalitions), formed a sub-group, named after the USEI (and, later, "USEI–IdeA"), within the Mixed Group of the Chamber, while the party's four senators joined the heterogeneous Great Autonomies and Freedom (GAL) group.

In May 2017 the party changed its allegiance both in the Chamber, where it formed a sub-group with the Union of the Centre (UdC) within the Mixed Group, and the Senate, where it left the GAL group and launched the alternative Federation of Freedom (FdL) group along with the Italian Liberal Party (PLI) and others, under Quagliariello's leadership.

In December 2017 IdeA was supposed to be a founding member of Us with Italy (NcI), a pro-Silvio Berlusconi centrist electoral list within the centre-right coalition for the 2018 general election, but finally stood out. NcI was launched by splinters from Popular Alternative (AP – two groups, a Christian-democratic one led by Maurizio Lupi and a liberal one led by Enrico Costa), Direction Italy (DC), Civic Choice (SC), Act! (F!), Cantiere Popolare (CP) and the Movement for the Autonomies (MpA). However, in early January 2018, after that NcI had been joined also by the UdC,  IdeA joined too, with the goal of reaching 3%, required to win seats from proportional lists under a new electoral law.

In the election the NcI obtained a mere 1.3% of the vote and only Quagliariello was re-elected for IdeA. Soon after the election, the party quit NcI and, along with the UdC, formed a pact with FI and joined its parliamentary group.

In the 2019 Basilicata regional election the party obtained 4.2% of the vote.

References

External links
Official website

2015 establishments in Italy
Conservative parties in Italy
Political parties established in 2015
Social conservative parties
European Christian Political Movement